Megachile tridentata is a species of bee in the family Megachilidae. It was described by Ashmead in 1900.

References

Tridentata
Insects described in 1900